Septimus Otter Barnes Ridsdale (2 August 1840 – 15 October 1884) was an English first-class cricketer and an officer in the Indian Civil Service.

The son of George William Hughes Ridsdale, he was born in August 1840 at Crowcombe, Somerset. He was educated at Tonbridge School, before going up to Wadham College, Oxford.  While studying at Oxford, he made two appearances in first-class cricket for Oxford University in 1862 against the Marylebone Cricket Club and Cambridge University in The University Match. Ridsdale was also a member of the Oxford University Boat Club and was a cox for the winning Oxford team in the 1861 Boat Race.

After graduating from Oxford, Ridsdale entered into the Indian Civil Service later in 1861. While traveling to Indian to take up his post, he was noted for saving the life of a man who fallen into the Nile, for which he was awarded a medal by the Royal Humane Society. He eventually rose to the position of officiating commissioner for Berar Province. Ridsdale died in British India at Fatehpur in October 1884.

References

External links

1840 births
1884 deaths
People from Somerset West
People educated at Tonbridge School
Alumni of Wadham College, Oxford
English cricketers
Oxford University cricketers
Oxford University Boat Club rowers
English civil servants
Indian Civil Service (British India) officers
Cricketers from the Western Cape